Dmitri Nikolayevich Varfolomeyev (born 15 March 1978) is a Russian former football player.

He is a younger brother of Sergei Varfolomeyev.

Honours
Zhenis Astana
Kazakhstan Premier League champion: 2001
Kazakhstan Cup winner: 2001

References

1978 births
Footballers from Saint Petersburg
Living people
Russian footballers
Russia under-21 international footballers
FC Saturn Ramenskoye players
FC Dynamo Saint Petersburg players
Russian Premier League players
Russian expatriate footballers
Expatriate footballers in Kazakhstan
FC Vityaz Podolsk players
FC Zhenis Astana players
FC Kristall Smolensk players
Association football midfielders